Chil Konar may refer to:
 Chil Konar, Kerman
 Chil Konar, Sistan and Baluchestan